The 3rd constituency of Yvelines is a French legislative constituency in the Yvelines département.

Description

The 3rd constituency of Yvelines includes parts of the wealthy western suburbs of Paris on the border with Hauts-de-Seine and to the north of Versailles.

The seat has consistently supported conservatives; however, until the 2012 elections these came from the centrist UDF rather than the Gaullist right. The constituency's deputy between 2002 and 2010, Christian Blanc, served as a minister in the government of François Fillon but resigned after a scandal concerning use of ministerial allowance's to purchase expensive cigars.

Historic representation

Election results

2022

 
 
 
 
 
 
 
|-
| colspan="8" bgcolor="#E9E9E9"|
|-

2017

 
 
 
 
 
 
 
|-
| colspan="8" bgcolor="#E9E9E9"|
|-

2012

 
 
 
 
 
 
 
|-
| colspan="8" bgcolor="#E9E9E9"|
|-
 
 

 
 
 
 
 

* Withdrew before the 2nd round

2007

 
 
 
 
 
 
|-
| colspan="8" bgcolor="#E9E9E9"|
|-

2002

 
 
 
 
 
|-
| colspan="8" bgcolor="#E9E9E9"|
|-

1997

 
 
 
 
 
 
 
|-
| colspan="8" bgcolor="#E9E9E9"|
|-
 
 

 
 
 
 
 

* RPR dissident

Sources

Official results of French elections from 2002: "Résultats électoraux officiels en France" (in French).

3